Ali Hussnein or Ali Sadiq Hussnein  (20 March 1925 – 20 May 2018) was a Libyan politician. He was the last foreign minister of the Kingdom of Libya (June–August 1969).

He participated in translating the Qur'an into Italian and also translated several Italian books into Arabic.  Previous to becoming foreign minister Hussnein had been the Libyan ambassador to the Soviet Union, Nigeria, and Finland.

References

Foreign ministers of Libya
1925 births
2018 deaths
People from Tripoli, Libya
Italian–Arabic translators
Translators of the Quran into Italian
Ambassadors of Libya to Nigeria
Ambassadors of Libya to the Soviet Union
Ambassadors of Libya to Finland
20th-century translators